Lasagnotte is a flat and wide pasta noodle. It is essentially a longer version of lasagnette.

References

Pasta